The 1878 Brown Bears football team represented Brown University in the 1878 college football season. The team traveled to Amherst, Massachusetts and played the Amherst in their first football game.

Schedule

References

Brown
Brown Bears football seasons
College football winless seasons
Brown Bear football